Oruvan is a 1999 Indian Tamil-language action drama film directed by Suresh Krissna. The film stars Sarathkumar and Pooja Batra while Devayani, Raghuvaran and Anandaraj play supporting roles. Produced by Lakshmi Movie Makers, the film had cinematography handled by S. Saravanan and music composed by Deva. It had a theatrical release across Tamil Nadu on 25 June 1999.

Cast
Sarathkumar as Surya
Pooja Batra as Kalpana
Devayani as Nandini
Raghuvaran as Krishna Prasad IPS,Director CBI, real father of boy adopted by Surya 
Anandaraj as Peter Fernandes
Manivannan
Delhi Ganesh
Vivek
Vadivelu
K. S. Jayalakshmi 
Master Vicky

Production
Hindi film actress Pooja Batra played her first lead role in Tamil cinema through the project. While the film was in the post-production stage, Suresh Krissna moved on to begin work on two other projects starring Karthik and Vijay. Neither film later materialised.

Soundtrack
The music was composed by Deva. The song "Chandamama" from Telugu film Auto Driver was reused as "Chinna Roja".

Release and reception 
The film had a theatrical release across Tamil Nadu on 25 June 1999. Usha Gopalakrishnan of the film portal Indolink praised the performance of Sarathkumar, but added "compared to director Suresh Krishna's earlier movies, this one is not so good. No need to watch in the theater. Can see in video tape." Thamarai Manalan of Dinakaran also gave the film a positive review, noting Suresh Krishna "has extracted hard and good work from the artists. The way in which he has conceived as well as picturized the passionate and emotive scenes connected with the small boy Vikky has earned the former our great appreciation."

References

1990s action drama films
1990s Tamil-language films
1999 films
Films directed by Suresh Krissna
Films scored by Deva (composer)
Indian action drama films